Ana wa Banati (English: My Daughters and I or Me and My Daughters) is a 1961 Egyptian film starring Salah Zulfikar, Nahed Sherif, and directed by Hussein Helmy El-Mohandess. The film features an ensemble cast that includes Zaki Rostom, Amaal Farid, Fayza Ahmed and Zahrat El-Ola.

Plot 

Samir is a playboy, he meets Maysa and likes her and she likes him back, but she didn't tell her father about her relationship. Her father is a struggling man but he can raise his four daughters well, but cannot provide enough money necessary to prepare them for marriage, and when he is referred to the pension, one of the swindlers takes his reward. The father enters the hospital as a result of an accident, and his daughters work to face life. One of them works as a singer in a hall, the second works as a model, the third writes stories and admires a great writer and takes him like her, and the fourth Maysa remains at home. The father knows their condition and decides to hide from sight. When Maysa loves Samir and falls into an affair with him, she decides to commit suicide and dies. Tragedy pushes the father back to reunite the family.

Crew 

 Writer: Hussein El-Mohandes
 Director: Hussein El-Mohandes
 Produced by: Mina Films (Victor Antoine)
 Distribution: Bahna Film
 Soundtrack: Ibrahim Haggag
 Cinematographer: Victor Antoine
 Editor: Albert Naguib

Cast

Primary cast
 Salah Zulfikar as Samir
 Nahed Sherif as Maysa Mahmoud Abdel-Fattah
 Zaki Rostom as Mahmoud Abdel-Fattah
 Amaal Farid as Mona Mahmoud Abdel-Fattah
 Zahrat El-Ola as Mervat Mahmoud Abdel-Fattah
 Fayza Ahmed as Mahassin Mahmoud Abdel-Fattah
 Abdel Moneim Ibrahim as Fahmy

Supporting cast
 Abdul-Ghani Al-Nagdi as Hamza
 Ahmad Farhat as Zanbah
 Edmond Twima as Ibrahim
 Abdulghani Qamar as Bayoumi
 Abdul Hamid Badawi as Bashndi
 Saleh Mohamed Saleh as Maestro
 Samira Mohamed as Fashion model
 Samiya Rushdi as Hamza's mother)
 Abbas Al-Dali as Afifi
 Fathiya Shaheen as Owner of the Fashion Store
 Saleh Al-Iskandarani as Gardener
 Farid Abdullah as Poker player 
 Ali Kamel as Gaber
 Ahmed Bali as Employee of a friend of Mahmoud
 Ahmed Morsi as Shawish
 Terry Kamel
 Zainab Nassar

See also 

 Egyptian cinema
 Salah Zulfikar filmography
 List of Egyptian films of 1961
 List of Egyptian films of the 1960s

References

External links 

 
 Ana wa Banati on elCinema

1961 films
Egyptian drama films
20th-century Egyptian films
Egyptian black-and-white films
1960s Arabic-language films
Films shot in Egypt